Mount Bastion is a mountain, 2,530 m, standing west of Webb Glacier and Gibson Spur, where the interior ice plateau meets the Willett Range in Victoria Land. It was named by the Victoria University of Wellington Antarctic Expedition (VUWAE) (1959–60) for its buttress-like appearance.

Mountains of Victoria Land
Scott Coast
Willett Range